Balwinder Singh Bains is an Indian politician from the state of Punjab and a former member of the Punjab Legislative Assembly.

Political career
In 2012 he contested as an independent candidate and won the election. In 2016 along with his brother Simarjit Singh Bains he formed Lok Insaaf Party.

Member of Legislative Assembly 
Between 2012 and 2022, as Member of the Legislative Assembly, Bains represented the Ludhiana South Assembly constituency of Punjab. In 2022 Punjab Legislative Assembly election he contested from his constituency Ludhiana South Assembly constituency and was defeated by Rajinder Pal Kaur of Aam Aadmi Party. Bains received 11.29% of the total votes polled and came on fourth position behind AAP, BJP and INC.

Personal life
Bains's brother Simarjit Singh Bains is also a Lok Insaaf Party member of the Punjab Legislative Assembly.

References 

People from Punjab, India
Living people
Punjab, India MLAs 2012–2017
Punjab, India MLAs 2017–2022
1959 births